Enterovirus D is a species of enterovirus which causes disease in humans. Five subtypes have been identified to date:

Enterovirus 68: causes respiratory disease, and is associated with acute flaccid paralysis (AFP) – a disease similar to polio.
Enterovirus 70: causes outbreaks of acute hemorrhagic conjunctivitis. 
Enterovirus 94: has been associated with a single case of AFP. 
Enterovirus 111: has been associated with a single case of AFP, and has been found in primate feces. 
Enterovirus 120: has only been found in non-human primate feces.

Similarities with Rhinovirus 
Enterovirus D has many serotypes and some closely resembling other viral species, such as Human rhinovirus (HRV) 87, which was reclassified as a strain of EV-D68 (Enterovirus D - Serotype 68)

References

Enteroviruses